This is a list of urban agglomerations and cities of Uttarakhand with a population above 100,000 as per 2011 Census of India:

Urban Agglomeration
In the census of India 2011, an Urban Agglomeration has been defined as follows:

"An urban agglomeration is a continuous urban spread constituting a town and its adjoining outgrowths, or two or more physically contiguous towns together with or without outgrowths of such towns. An Urban Agglomeration must consist of at least a statutory town and its total population (i.e. all the constituents put together) should not be less than 20,000 as per the 2001 Census. In varying local conditions, there were similar other combinations which have been treated
as urban agglomerations satisfying the basic condition of contiguity."

Constituents of Urban Agglomerations in Uttarakhand
The constituents of Urban Agglomerations in Uttarakhand with a population of 1 lakh or above, are noted below:

Dehradun UA includes Dehradun (M Corp.), Bharuwala Grant (OG), Dehradun Cantonment (CB), FRI and College Area (CT), Raipur (CT), Natthanpur (CT), Natthuwala (CT) and Clement Town (CB).

Haridwar UA includes Haridwar (M Corp.), BHEL Ranipur (IT), Gurukul Kangri (Part) (OG), Jwalapur Mahavidyalaya (Part) (OG), SIDCUL Haridwar (Part) (OG), Rawli Mahdud (CT) and Jagjitpur (CT).

Haldwani-cum-Kathgodam UA includes Haldwani (M Corp.) Kathgodam (MC), Damua Dhunga Bandobasti (OG) - Ward No. 26, Byura (OG) - Ward No. 27, Bamori Talli Bandobasti, Amrawati Colony, Shakti Vihar, Bhatt Colony (OG) - Ward No. 28, Manpur Uttar (Palika Yatayat Nagar) (OG) - Ward No. 29, Haripur Sukhan (Van Cancer Hospital) (OG) - Ward No. 30, Gaujajali Uttar (Shishu Bharati Vidya Mandir) (OG) - Ward No. 31, Kusumkhera (OG) - Ward No. 32, Bithoria No. 1 (OG) - Ward No. 33, Korta (Chanmari Mohalla) (OG) - Ward No. 34 (Part), Bamori Malli (OG) - Ward No. 35 (Part), Bamori Talli Kham (OG) - Ward No. 36 (Part), Mukhani (CT) and Haldwani Talli (CT).

Roorkee UA includes Roorkee (M Corp.), Roorkee Cantonment (CB), Salempur Rajputan (CT), Landhaura (MC), Sunhaira (CT), Shafipur (CT), Khanjarpur (CT), Padali Gujjar (CT), Nagla Imarti (CT), Dhandera (CT) and Mohanpur Mohammadpur (CT).

Rudrapur UA includes Rudrapur (M Corp.), Jagatpura (OG), SIDCUL Rudrapur (Part) (OG) and Rampura (Part) (OG).

Rishikesh UA includes Rishikesh (MC), IDPL Virbhadra (IT), Rishikesh (CT), Gumaniwala (CT) Shyampur (CT) and Khadri Kharak Maf (CT).

Abbreviations: M Corp. = Municipal Corporation, MC = Municipal Council, CB = Cantonment Board, NA = Notified Area, IT = Industrial Township, CT = Census Town, OG = Out Growth

Urban Agglomeration constituents
Urban Agglomerations constituents with a population above 100,000 as per 2011 census are shown in the table below.

Municipal Corporations

Municipal Councils

Notified Areas (Nagar Panchayats)

Cantonment Boards

Census Towns

See also
List of urban local bodies in Uttarakhand
List of metropolitan areas in India
List of cities in India by population
List of municipal corporations in India

References

Population
Cities in Uttarakhand by population
Uttarakhand